Lambula pristina is a moth of the family Erebidae. It was described by Francis Walker in 1866. It is found in Australia (Queensland, the Northern Territory and New South Wales).

The wingspan is about 20 mm. The forewings are brown and the hindwings are pale brown.

The larvae feed on Raphia australis.

References

 

Lithosiina
Moths described in 1866